William "Willy" Larsen (November 18, 1885 – March 10, 1935) was a Finnish American accordionist and director.

Larsen's ancestors came to Finland from Norway in the 17th-century, and he was born in Kotka. As a young man Larsen became a sailor and moved to the US before World War I. He settled down in New York City, where he performed at the Finnish American halls. Between 1920 and 1931, Larsen made 42 solo recordings for Columbia Records. He also made several recordings as accompanist for various artists, including Leo Kauppi and Hannes Saari.

Discography

1920
 Apostol schottische (with Martti Söderlund)
 Elisabetin jänkä (with Martti Söderlund)
 Tyttöjen vienti

1921
 Suomen ent. kaartin marssi
 Kymmenen kynttä
 Lammen laine
 Merellä

1925
 Lyytin polkka
 Kaipuu
 Kerenski
 Surut pois

December 25, 1925
 Heilani kanssa
 Yksin
 Taikayö
 Pohjalaispolkka

May 8, 1926
 Rakkauden kaiho
 Syystunnelma
 Suomen polkkaa

August 4, 1926
 Eveliina polkka
 Helmi
 Viimeinen valssi

April 21, 1927
 Elämää juoksuhaudoissa (with Stanley Lutz)
 Syysruusuja (with Stanley Lutz)

May 17, 1927
 Turun polkka (with Stanley Lutz)
 Maijani kanssa (with Stanley Lutz)

1928
 Elokuun kuutamo
 Muistoja synnyinlaaksosta
 Muistoja Pohjolasta

April 10, 1928
 Jäähyvästi isänmaa
 Kultani kainalossa
 Kyllikki valssi
 Lukkari-Heikin polkka

February 17, 1930
 Seurasaaren polkka
 Soittajan kohtalo
 Poikain vienti
 Muistoja Karpaateilta

1931
 Eveliina polkka
 Viipurin sottiisi
 Sydänsuru
 Lemmenkaipuu

References

1885 births
1935 deaths
20th-century Finnish male musicians
Finnish accordionists
People from Kotka
Finnish emigrants to the United States (1809–1917)
Finnish people of Norwegian descent